Orangutan Island is an American documentary television series, in the style of the earlier series Meerkat Manor, that blends more traditional documentary filming with dramatic narration. The series was produced by NHNZ with creator Judith Curran also acting as the series producer.  Animal Planet's Martha Ripp is the executive producer of the series, and Lone Drøscher Nielsen of the Borneo Orangutan Survival Foundation, the founder, and manager of the Nyaru Menteng Orangutan Reintroduction Project, regularly appears with the orangutans in the show. The series premiered on Animal Planet on November 2, 2007, with new episodes airing Friday nights. A second season began airing in November 2008.

The show focuses on a group of orphaned orangutans at the Nyaru Menteng Orangutan Rescue and Rehabilitation Center that are raised to go against their normally independent nature and instead cooperate and live together in a society so they can be left to live wild on their protected island.

Production details
Anne Russon, a psychologist who has conducted extensive research in primate intelligence is acting as a scientific adviser for the series. Lone Drøscher Nielsen is the founder and project manager of the Nyaru Menteng Orangutan Rescue and Reintroduction Center and regularly appears in the show interacting with and caring for the orangutan orphans.

Episodes

Season 1: 2007-2008

Season 2: 2008-2009

See also
Orangutan Diary
The Disenchanted Forest
The Burning Season

References

External links
 Official Site on Animal Planet
 Orangutan Outreach
 NHNZ

Animal Planet original programming
2007 American television series debuts
2000s American documentary television series
2009 American television series endings
Nature educational television series
Nature conservation in Indonesia
Orangutan conservation
Television shows about apes
Television shows set in Indonesia